TOI-178 is a planetary system in the constellation Sculptor, which appears to have at least five, and possibly six, planets in a chain of Laplace resonances, which constitute one of the longest chains yet discovered in a system of planets. The system also has unusual variations in the densities among the planets.

The system is 205 light-years away, which is relatively close, implying that such systems may be relatively common. The brightness of the star, TOI-178, facilitates followup observations, which make it an ideal system in which to expand our understanding of planet formation and evolution.

The planetary system was confirmed by data provided by five different planet search projects. After TESS provided first hints at a system with an interesting resonant chain, additional observations to refine the measurement and confirm the finding were provided by CHEOPS, ESPRESSO, NGTS and SPECULOOS. Over the coming years, observations of transit-timing variations in the transits of the various planets, which are expected to range from minutes to tens of minutes, should help pin down the planetary masses and uncover the eccentricities of the various orbits.

Orbital resonance
Of the six planets, named TOI-178b through TOI-178g as per IAU convention, the outer five are locked in a chain of Laplace resonances. The periods of the planets, in days, revolving around the star are b = 1.91, c = 3.24, d = 6.56, e = 9.96, f = 15.23, and g = 20.71. While this is not a perfect integer ratio, there exists a frame of reference that rotates by roughly 1.37° day−1, in which successive conjunctions of the planets form a repeating pattern. For an observer rotating within this frame of reference, the planets c through g  form a chain of resonance that can be expressed as 2:4:6:9:12 in ratios of periods, or as 18:9:6:4:3 in ratios of orbits, which means that for every eighteen revolutions of the planet c, the planet d completes nine, the planet e six, the planet f four, and the planet g three.

In addition, the planet b orbits close to where it would also be a part of the same resonant chain. In a slightly bigger orbit of period of ~1.95 days, it would form a 3:5 resonance with the planet c in the same corotating frame of reference as the other five. It is possible that the entire system originally formed in one long resonant chain, but later the innermost planet was pulled out of it, perhaps by tidal interactions.

See also 
 Kepler-80 – another system with five planets in an orbital resonance
Kepler-223
TOI-178c—A super earth in the TOI-178 system

References

Sculptor (constellation)
K-type main-sequence stars
178, TOI
J00291228-3027133
Planetary systems with six confirmed planets
Planetary transit variables